is a Japanese anime director, writer, producer and storyboard artist, who is among Sunrise's noted directors.  He was born in Nisshin, Aichi, Japan.

Works

Anime television series
Zettai Muteki Raijin-Oh (storyboards, episode direction, background production; 1991)
Genki Bakuhatsu Ganbaruger (storyboards, episode direction; 1992)
Nekketsu Saikyo Gozaurer (storyboards, episode direction; 1993)
Mobile Fighter G Gundam (storyboards, episode direction; 1994)
Jūsenshi Gulkeeva (storyboards, episode direction; 1995)
New Mobile Report Gundam Wing (storyboards; 1995)
Brave Command Dagwon (storyboards, episode direction; 1996)
After War Gundam X (storyboards; 1996)
Reideen the Superior (storyboards, episode direction; 1996)
The King of Braves GaoGaiGar (storyboards, episode direction; 1997)
Kochira Katsushika-ku Kameari Kōen-mae Hashutsujo (storyboards; 1997)
Gasaraki (assistant director, storyboards, episode direction; 1998)
Infinite Ryvius (director, storyboards, episode direction; 1999)
s-CRY-ed (director, storyboards, episode direction; 2001)
Daigunder (storyboards, 2002)
Shinkon Gattai Godannar: 1st (storyboards of ep. 3; 2003)
Planetes (director, storyboards management, episode direction; 2003)
Mai-HiME (creative producer; 2004)
Honey and Clover (storyboards of ep. 5; 2005)
Gun x Sword (director, storyboards; 2005)
SoltyRei (planning coordinator; 2005)
Code Geass: Lelouch of the Rebellion (director, original story, storyboards management; 2006)
Bamboo Blade (guest appearance; 2007)
Code Geass: Lelouch of the Rebellion R2 (director, original story; 2008)
Linebarrels of Iron (creative producer; 2008)
Dogs: Stray Dogs Howling in the Dark (production assistance; 2009)
Fantasista Doll (creative producer; 2013)
Space Dandy (storyboards for episodes 7 and 14; 2014)
Maria the Virgin Witch (director; 2015)
Active Raid (chief director; 2016)
ID-0 (director; 2017)
Revisions (director; 2019)
Back Arrow (director, co-creator; 2021)
Skate-Leading Stars (chief director; 2021)
Estab Life: Great Escape (original concept, creative supervision; 2022)

Anime films
Jungle Taitei - Yūki ga Mirai o Kaeru (director, 2009)
Code Geass Lelouch of the Re;surrection (director; 2019)
One Piece Film: Red (director, storyboard; 2022)
Eiga Estab Life: Revengers' Road (original concept, director, screenplay; 2023)

Original video animations
One Piece: Defeat The Pirate Ganzack (director; 1998) (special production of Super Jump Anime Tour)
Kanzen Shōri Daitei Ō (storyboards; 2001)

Manga
Code Geass: Jet-Black Renya (original script; 2010–2013)
Atrail - Nisekawiteki Nichijou to Senmitsu Element (original script; 2015–2018)

Video games
Estab Life: Unity Memories (original concept, creative supervision; TBA)

Notes and references

External links
 

Sunrise (company) people
Anime directors
1966 births
People from Nisshin, Aichi
Living people